The 1983 Cross River State gubernatorial election occurred on August 13, 1983. NPN candidate Donald Etiebet won the election.

Results
Donald Etiebet representing NPN won the election. The election held on August 13, 1983.

References 

Cross River State gubernatorial elections
Cross River State gubernatorial election
Cross River State gubernatorial election